Walvis Bay Urban is a constituency in the Erongo Region of Namibia, comprising most of the city of Walvis Bay. It had a population of 35,828 in 2011, up from 27,941 in 2001.  the constituency had 25,311 registered voters.

Politics
In the 2010 regional elections, SWAPO's Hafeni Ndemula won the constituency with 4,254 votes. His only challenger was Sippora Ndeshihala Kamati of the Rally for Democracy and Progress (RDP), who received 789 votes. Ndemula also won the 2015 regional elections with 3,719 votes. Clementia Hababeb of the Democratic Turnhalle Alliance (DTA) came second with 461 votes, and Cornelius John Jansen (RDP) obtained 192.

After councillor Ndemula was fielded as a parliamentary candidate in the 2019 Namibian general election, a by-election became necessary for Walvis Bay Urban because Namibian electoral law prohibits sitting councillors and members of the public service to run for a seat in parliament. The by-election was conducted on 15 January 2020. Knowledge Ipinge, an independent candidate, won with 1,636 votes, followed by Sirie Topulathana (SWAPO, 1,313 votes). Jason Iilonga (independent) and Richard Hoaeb (Popular Democratic Movement (PDM)) also ran and gained 436 and 208 votes, respectively. The 2020 regional election was won by Deriou Andred Benson of the Independent Patriots for Change (IPC, an opposition party formed in August 2020). He obtained 4,531 votes. The SWAPO candidate, Miina Teuthigilua Hangula, came second with 2,705 votes. Ipinge, the sitting councillor, ended third with 947 votes.

References

Constituencies of Erongo Region
Walvis Bay
States and territories established in 1992
1992 establishments in Namibia